Pomalwadi is a village in the Karmala taluka of Solapur district in Maharashtra state, India.

Demographics
Covering  and comprising 238 households at the time of the 2011 census of India, Pomalwadi had a population of 1130. There were 574 males and 556 females, with 140 people being aged six or younger.

References

Villages in Karmala taluka